Joshua Wells House, also known as Wells-Fleet-Goldsmith-Kendrick House and 1680 House, is a historic home located at Cutchogue in Suffolk County, New York. It is a -story, timber-framed residence constructed about 1680 and extensively remodeled in 1815.  The house has been moved twice and now sits on a brick foundation constructed during its last move in 1857.

It was added to the National Register of Historic Places in 2002.

References

External links

Houses on the National Register of Historic Places in New York (state)
Historic American Buildings Survey in New York (state)
Federal architecture in New York (state)
Houses in Suffolk County, New York
National Register of Historic Places in Suffolk County, New York